Unity is a split album by Dropkick Murphys and Agnostic Front. It was released in December 1999

Song information

Track listing
"Nobody's Hero" (Stiff Little Fingers/Gordon Ogilvie) – 3:49
"Pipebomb on Lansdowne" (Extended Dance Remix) (Dropkick Murphys) – 2:03
"9 Seconds Remaining"  (Agnostic Front) – 2:22
"Sit and Watch (Demo Version)" (Agnostic Front) – 1:52

References

Dropkick Murphys albums
Agnostic Front albums
1999 EPs
Split EPs